Amalric (Aimery) Barlais (died before June 1253) was a baron in the Kingdom of Cyprus, born in Jaffa. He was a son of Renaud Barlais, bailli of Jaffa in 1197 under Aimery of Cyprus, and Isabelle of Bethsan. Isabelle's birth and marriages are recorded in the Lignages d’Outremer as well as in the works of William of Tyre.

Biography 
At an early age, Amalric moved to Cyprus, where he rose to become one of the kingdom's leading barons, and one of the opponents of the dominant Ibelin family. In 1227, he was appointed by Alice of Cyprus, then living in voluntary exile, to be the ruling bailli of her underage son, Henry I of Cyprus. This appointment was rejected by the island's Haute Cour, which instead appointed Henry's regent, Philip of Ibelin. Amalric joined Alice in exile in Tripoli, but made contact through his aide Gavin of Chenichy with emperor Friedrich II, who was then preparing for the Sixth Crusade.

In July 1228, Frederick II landed in Cyprus and temporarily ended the government of John of Ibelin, the Old Lord of Beirut. He then set up a five-member Regency Council consisting of Amalric, Gavin of Chenichy, Amalrich of Bethsan, Hugo of Gibelet and Wilhelm of Rivet. On 3 September 1228, Frederick departed for Acre, taking Henry I and John of Ibelin with him. He was to sell the bailliage of Cyprus to Amalric Barlais and his four colleagues, collecting revenue for three years.

At the conclusion of the Sixth Crusade, the emperor left for Italy on 1 May 1229. Ibelin responded with military force, defeating the imperial council in a battle outside Nicosia on 14 July 1229, thus beginning the War of the Lombards. Amalric fled with the young king and his sisters to Dieu d'Amour Castle, where he was able to withstand a siege for a year, surrendering in the summer of 1230. The victorious Ibelin forced Amalric to give up his reign in Cyprus, supported by the Haute Cour and the king.

In February 1232, Amalric was forced to take part in Ibelin's campaign against the imperial governor in the Kingdom of Jerusalem, Richard Filangieri. As soon as the Cypriot army went ashore near Tripoli, he withdrew with a few companions and allied himself with Filangieri. While Ibelin and his supporters were busy fighting on the mainland, Amalric received an army from Filangieri with which he wreaked havoc over defenseless Cyprus and conquered multiple castle. After the victory at Casal Imbert on 2 May 1232, Filangieri also crossed Cyprus to complete the conquest of the island. But only a month later, the Ibelins were also able to return to the island with the help of the Genoese and on 15 June 1232, they were victorious over Filangieri in the Battle of Agridi. Amalric and his comrades-in-arms, was forced to flee from Cyprus again, this time to Cilician Armenia. In April 1233, Kyrenia, the last castle in Cyprus to be held by the imperial family, fell.

Family 
Amalric was married to Agnes of Marqab (died after 1239), daughter of Bertrand, lord of Marqab, with whom he had five sons and a daughter, Philippa. Philippa Barlais married Guy of Ibelin, constable of Cyprus and son of John of Ibelin, around 1240. The second-born son may have been William Barlais, Lord of Beirut.

References

Bibliography

 
 
 
 
 
 
 

 
 
 
 
 
 
 
 

1253 deaths
Year of birth unknown
13th-century Cypriot people
13th-century people of the Kingdom of Jerusalem
Christians of the Sixth Crusade